Fosse aux Lions National Park is a national park in the Savanes Region of Northern Togo.

At one point, the park was home to a significant number of African elephants in the 1970s and 1980s, but their numbers have declined to nearly zero.

The small town of Tandjouaré, Togo lies within the park.

References

National parks of Togo
Protected areas established in 1954
IUCN Category II
Savanes Region, Togo